Philosophers (and others important in the history of philosophy), listed alphabetically:

Note: This list has a minimal criteria for inclusion and the relevance to philosophy of some individuals on the list is disputed.

D
 Jean le Rond d'Alembert (1717–1783)
 Damascius (c. 462–540)
 Peter Damian (c. 1007–1072)
 Hubert Damisch (1928–2017)
 Arthur Danto (1924–2013)
 Charles Darwin (1809–1882)
 Erasmus Darwin (1731–1802)
 David of Dinant (12th century)
 David the Invincible (late 6th century)
 Donald Davidson (1917–2003)
 Angela Davis (born 1944)
 Jalal al-Din al-Dawani (1426–1502)
 Simone de Beauvoir (1908–1986)
 Bruno de Finetti (1906–1985)
 Joseph de Maistre (1753–1821)
 Paul de Man (1919–1983)
 Augustus De Morgan (1806–1871)
 Francesco de Sanctis (1817–1883)
 Guy Debord (1931–1994)
 Régis Debray (born 1940)
 Richard Dedekind (1831–1916)
 Joseph Déjacque (1821–1865)
 Gilles Deleuze (1925–1995)
 Bernard Delfgaauw (1912–1993)
 Elijah Delmedigo (1460–1497)
 Giorgio Del Vecchio (1878–1970)
 Democritus (460–370 BC)
 Alain Deneault (born 1970) 
 Daniel Dennett (born 1942)
 Denys the Carthusian (or Denys de Leeuwis) (1402–1471)
 Jacques Derrida (1930–2004)
 René Descartes (1596–1650)
 Vincent Descombes (born 1943)
 Robert Desgabets (1610–1678)
 Antoine Destutt de Tracy (1754–1836)
 Paul Deussen (1845–1919)
 Alejandro Deustua (1849–1945)
 John Dewey (1859–1952)
 Dharmakirti (c. 7th century)
 Albert Venn Dicey (1835–1922)
 Denis Diderot (1713–1784)
 Dietrich of Freiberg (13th century)
 Joseph Dietzgen (1828–1888)
 Kenelm Digby (1603–1665)
 Dignaga (c. 480–c. 540)
 Wilhelm Dilthey (1833–1911)
 Hugo Dingler (1881–1954)
 Diodorus Cronus (3rd century BC)
 Diogenes Laërtius (3rd century)
 Diogenes of Apollonia (c. 460 BC)
 Diogenes of Babylon (c. 230–c. 150/140 BC)
 Diogenes of Oenoanda (2nd century)
 Diogenes the Cynic of Sinope (412–323 BC)
 Dogen Zenji (or Dōgen Kigen) (1200–1253)
 Dong Zhongshu (or Tung Chung-shu) (c. 176–c. 104)
 Herman Dooyeweerd (1894–1977)
 Fyodor Dostoyevsky (1821–1881)
 Frederick Douglass (1818–1895)
 Fred Dretske (1932–2013)
 Hans Adolf Eduard Driesch (1867–1941)
 W. E. B. Du Bois (1868–1963)
 Emil du Bois-Reymond (1818–1896)
 Jean-Baptiste Dubos (1670–1742)
 Émilie du Châtelet (1706–1749)
 Guillaume du Vair (1556–1621)
 Curt Ducasse (1881–1969)
 Pierre Duhem (1861–1916)
 Eugen Dühring (1833–1921)
 Michael Dummett (1925–2011)
 Raya Dunayevskaya (1910–1987)
 James Dunbar (1742–1798)
 Duns Scotus (c. 1266–1308)
 Profiat Duran (or Efodi or Isaac ben Moses Levi) (c. 1349–c. 1414)
 Simeon ben Zemah Duran (or Rashbaz) (1361–1444)
 Durandus of St. Pourçain (c. 1275–1334)
 Will Durant (1885–1981)
 Émile Durkheim (1858–1917)
 Enrique Dussel (born 1934)
 Ronald Dworkin (1931–2013)

E
 Jonathan Earle (born 1970)
 John Earman (born 1942)
 Johann Augustus Eberhard (1739–1809)
 Meister Eckhart (1260–1327/8)
 Umberto Eco (1932–2016)
 Arthur Stanley Eddington (1882–1944)
 Jonathan Edwards (1703–1758)
 Paul Edwards (1923–2004)
 Christian von Ehrenfels (1856–1932)
 Albert Einstein (1879–1955)
 Mircea Eliade (1907–1986)
 Elias (6th century)
 George Eliot (1819–1880)
 T. S. Eliot (1888–1965)
 Elisabeth of Bohemia (1618–1680)
 Jon Elster (born 1940)
 Ralph Waldo Emerson (1803–1882)
 Empedocles (490 BC–430 BC)
 Friedrich Engels (1820–1895)
 Epicharmus (c. 540–450 BC)
 Epictetus (AD 55–c. 135)
 Epicurus (341 BC–270 BC)
 Desiderius Erasmus (1466–1536)
 Johannes Scotus Eriugena (c. 800–c. 880)
 Rudolf Christoph Eucken (1846–1926)
 Eudoxus of Cnidus (410/408 BC–355 or 347 BC)
 Eusebius of Caesarea (264–339)
 Gareth Evans (1946–1980)

F
 Emil Fackenheim (1916–2003)
 Thome H. Fang (1899–1976)
 Frantz Fanon (1925–1961)
 Al-Farabi (870–950)
 Michael Faraday (1791–1867)
 Michelangelo Fardella (1646–1718)
 Raimundo de Farias Brito (1862–1917)
 Austin Marsden Farrer (1904–1968)
 Fazang (or Fa-Tsang) (643–712)
 Gustav Fechner (1801–1887)
 Andrew Feenberg (born 1943)
 Herbert Feigl (1902–1988)
 Joel Feinberg (1926–2004)
 José Pablo Feinmann (1943–2021)
 Valentin Feldman (1909–1942)
 Margaret Fell (1614–1702)
 François de Salignac de la Mothe-Fénelon (1651–1715)
 Feng Youlan (1895–1990)
 Adam Ferguson (1723–1816)
 Ann Ferguson (born 1938)
 Jose Ferrater-Mora (1912–1991)
 Luigi Ferri (1826–1895)
 James Frederick Ferrier (1808–1864)
 Ludwig Feuerbach (1804–1872)
 Paul Feyerabend (1924–1994)
 Johann Gottlieb Fichte (1762–1814)
 Marsilio Ficino (1433–1499)
 Hartry Field (born 1946)
 Robert Filmer (1588–1653)
 J. N. Findlay (1903–1987)
 Eugen Fink (1905–1975)
 John Finnis (born 1940)
 Kuno Fischer (1824–1907)
 Ronald Fisher (1890–1962)
 John Fiske (1842–1901)
 Richard FitzRalph (c. 1300–1360)
 Ludwik Fleck (1896–1961)
 Pavel Aleksandrovich Florenskii (1882–1937)
 Georges Florovsky (1893–1979)
 Robert Fludd (1574–1637)
 Jerry Fodor (1935–2017)
 Robert J. Fogelin (1932–2016)
 Dagfinn Føllesdal (born 1932)
 Benjamin Fondane (1898–1944)
 Pedro da Fonseca (1528–1599)
 Bernard le Bovier de Fontenelle (1657–1757)
 Philippa Foot (1920–2010)
 David Fordyce (1711–1751)
 Michel Foucault (1926–1984)
 Simon Foucher (1644–1696)
 Alfred Fouillée (1838–1922)
 Charles Fourier (1772–1837)
 Francis of Marchia (ca. 1290–ca. 1344)
 Francis of Meyronnes (1285–1328)
 Sebastian Franck (1499–1542)
 Jerome Frank (1889–1957)
 Erich Frank (1883–1949)
 Semën Liudvigovich Frank (1877–1950)
 William K. Frankena (1908–1994)
 Harry Gordon Frankfurt (born 1929)
 Benjamin Franklin (1706–1790)
 Michael Frede (1940–2007)
 Gottlob Frege (1848–1925)
 Hans Frei (1922–1988)
 Paulo Freire (1921–1997)
 Sigmund Freud (1856–1939)
 Jakob Friedrich Fries (1773–1843)
 Friedrich Fröbel (1782–1852)
 Erich Fromm (1900–1980) 
 Marilyn Frye (born 1941)
 Fujiwara Seika (1561–1619)
 Lon L. Fuller (1902–1978)
Richard Fumerton (born 1949)
 Nikolai Fyodorovich Fyodorov (1828–1906)

G
 Gadadhara Bhattacharya (1604–1709)
 Hans-Georg Gadamer (1900–2002)
 Muammar Gaddafi (1941–2011)
 Gaius (110–180)
 Galen (131–201)
 Galileo Galilei (1564–1642)
 Pasquale Galluppi (1770–1846)
 Rafael Gambra Ciudad (1920–2004)
 Mahatma Gandhi (1869–1948)
 Gangeśa (fl. c. 1325)
 Réginald Garrigou-Lagrange (1887–1964)
 Christian Garve (1742–1798)
 Pierre Gassendi (1592–1655)
 Marcel Gauchet (born 1946)
 Gaunilo (11th century)
 Aksapada Gautama (c. 2nd century BC)
 Siddhartha Gautama (or Buddha) (ca. 563–483 BC)
 David Gauthier (born 1932)
 John Gay (1685–1732)
 Peter Geach (1919–2013)
 Arnold Gehlen (1904–1976)
 Antonio Genovesi (1712–1769)
 Ronald Giere 
 Giovanni Gentile (1875–1944)
 Gerhard Gentzen (1909–1945)
 George of Trebizond (1395–1484)
 Gerard of Cremona (1114–1187)
 Gerard of Odo (or Gerald Odonis) (1290–1349)
 Alexander Gerard (1728–1795)
 Gerbert of Aurillac (or Pope Silvester II) (c. 950–1003)
 Giacinto Sigismondo Gerdil (1718–1802)
 Jean Gerson (1363–1429)
 Gersonides (or Levi ben Gershon) (1288–1344)
 Edmund Gettier (1927–2021)
 Arnold Geulincx (1624–1669)
 Alan Gewirth (1912–2004)
 Joseph Geyser (1869–1948)
 Al-Ghazali (1058–1111)
 Allan Gibbard (born 1942)
 Edward Gibbon (1737–1794)
 Josiah Gibbs (1839–1903)
 Gilbert of Poitiers (1070–1154)
 Giles of Rome (c. 1243–1316)
 Étienne Gilson (1884–1978)
 Asher Ginsberg (or Ahad Ha'am) (1856–1927)
 Vincenzo Gioberti (1801–1852)
 Joseph Glanvill (1636–1680)
 Jonathan Glover (born 1941)
 Arthur de Gobineau (1816–1882)
 Rudolph Goclenius (1547–1628)
 Kurt Gödel (1906–1978)
 Godfrey of Fontaines (c. 1250–1309)
 William Godwin (1756–1836)
 Johann Wolfgang Goethe (1749–1832)
 Friedrich Gogarten (1887–1968)
 Alvin Goldman (born 1938)
 Lucien Goldmann (1913–1970)
 Gongsun Longzi (c. 300 BC)
 Nelson Goodman (1906–1998)
 Gorampa (1429–1489)
 Gorgias (c. 483–375 BC)
 André Gorz (1923–2007)
 Johann Christoph Gottsched (1700–1766)
 Marie de Gournay (1565–1645)
 Baltasar Gracián y Morales (1601–1658)
 Antonio Gramsci (1891–1937)
 Asa Gray (1810–1888)
 John Gray (born 1948)
 Hilary Greaves (born 1978)
 Thomas Hill Green (1836–1882)
 Pope Gregory I (540–604)
 Gregory of Nazianzus (329–389)
 Gregory of Nyssa (c. 335–398)
 Gregory of Rimini (d. 1358)
 Herbert Paul Grice (1913–1988)
 James Griffin (1933–2019)
 Germain Grisez (1929–2018)
 Robert Grosseteste (1175–1253)
 Reinhardt Grossmann (1931–2010)
 John Grote (1813–1866)
 Hugo Grotius (1583–1645)
 Adolf Grunbaum (1923–2018)
 Karl Grün (1817–1887)
 Guan Zhong (or Kuan Tzu or Kwan Chung or Guanzi) (740–645 BC)
 Félix Guattari (1930–1992)
 Ernesto "Che" Guevara (1928–1967)
 Guo Xiang (c. 252–312)
 Edmund Gurney (1847–1888)
 Aron Gurwitsch (1901–1973)

H
 Susan Haack (born 1945)
 Jürgen Habermas (born 1929)
 Ian Hacking (born 1936)
 Ernst Haeckel (1834–1919)
 Axel Anders Theodor Hagerstrom (1868–1939)
 Yehuda Halevi (c. 1085–1141)
 Johann Georg Hamann (1730–1788)
 Octave Hamelin (1856–1907)
 Sir William Hamilton (1788–1856)
 David Walter Hamlyn (1924–2012)
 Stuart Hampshire (1914–2004)
 Hassan Hanafi (1935–2021)
 Han Feizi (died 233 BC)
 Han Yu (768–824)
 Alastair Hannay (born 1932)
 Eduard Hanslick (1825–1904)
 Norwood Russell Hanson (1922–1967)
 Sandra Harding (born 1935)
 Michael Hardt (born 1960)
 R. M. Hare (1919–2002)
 Gilbert Harman (1938–2021)
 Adolf von Harnack (1851–1930)
 James Harrington (1611–1677)
 Sam Harris (born 1967)
 William Torrey Harris (1835–1909)
 H. L. A. Hart (1907–1992)
 David Hartley (1705–1757)
 Eduard Von Hartmann (1842–1906)
 Nicolai Hartmann (1882–1950)
 Charles Hartshorne (1897–2000)
 William Harvey (1578–1657)
 Seiichi Hatano (1877–1950)
 Hayashi Razan (1583–1657)
 Friedrich Hayek (1899–1992)
 William Hazlitt (1778–1830)
 Christian Friedrich Hebbel (1813–1863)
 G.W.F. Hegel (1770–1831)
 Martin Heidegger (1889–1976)
 Carl Heim (1874–1958)
 Werner Heisenberg (1901–1976)
 Virginia Held (born 1929)
 Ágnes Heller (1929–2019)
 Hermann von Helmholtz (1821–1894)
 Franciscus Mercurius van Helmont (1614–1698)
 Claude Adrien Helvétius (1715–1771)
 Carl Gustav Hempel (1905–1997)
 Frans Hemsterhuis (1721–1790)
 Henricus Regius (1598–1679)
 Henry of Ghent (c. 1217–1293)
 Henry of Harclay (1270–1317)
 Michel Henry (1922–2002)
 Ronald William Hepburn (1927–2008)
 Heraclides Ponticus (387–312 BC)
 Heraclitus of Ephesus (ca. 535–475 BC)
 Johann Friedrich Herbart (1776–1841)
 Edward Herbert, 1st Baron Herbert of Cherbury (1583–1648)
 Johann Gottfried Herder (1744–1803)
 Abraham Cohen de Herrera (or Alonso Nunez de Herrera or Abraham Irira), (1562–1635)
 John Herschel (1792–1871)
 Heinrich Rudolf Hertz (1857–1894)
 Hervaeus Natalis (1250–1323)
 Alexander Herzen (1812–1870)
 Abraham Joshua Heschel (1907–1972)
 Hesiod (c. 700 BC)
 Moses Hess (1812–1875)
 Boris M. Hessen (1893–1936) 
 Sergei Iosifovich Hessen (1887–1950)
 William of Heytesbury (or Hentisberus or Hentisberi or Tisberi), (1313–1373)
 John Hick (1922–2012)
 Laurens Perseus Hickok (1798–1888)
 Hierocles the Stoic (2nd century)
 David Hilbert (1862–1943)
 Hildegard of Bingen (1098–1179)
 Hillel ben Samuel of Verona (1220–1295)
 Hermann Friedrich Wilhelm Hinrichs (1794–1861)
 Jaakko Hintikka (1929–2015)
 Hipparchia of Maroneia (c. 350 BC – c. 280 BC) 
 Hippias (5th century BC)
 Hippocrates (460–380 BC)
 Ho Yen (190–249)
 Thomas Hobbes (1588–1679)
 Leonard Trelawny Hobhouse (1864–1929)
 William Ernest Hocking (1873–1966)
 Shadworth Hodgson (1832–1912)
 Harald Høffding (1843–1931)
 Wesley Newcomb Hohfeld (1879–1918)
 Baron d'Holbach (1723–1789)
 Robert Holcot (1290–1349)
 Friedrich Hölderlin (1770–1843)
 John Holloway (sociologist) (born 1947)
 Oliver Wendell Holmes, Jr. (1841–1935)
 Edwin Holt (1873–1946)
 Henry Home, Lord Kames (1696–1782)
 Homer (c. 700 BC)
 Richard Hönigswald (1875–1947)
 Sidney Hook (1902–1989)
 Brad Hooker (born 1957) 
 Richard Hooker (1554–1600)
 Max Horkheimer (1895–1973)
 Jennifer Hornsby (born 1951)
 Paul Horwich (born 1947)
 George Howison (1834–1916)
 Hsi K'ang (223–262)
 Hsiung Shih-li (1885–1968)
 Hsu Fu-kuan (1903–1982)
 Hsu Hsing (c. 300 BC)
 Hu Hung (or Wu-Feng) (1100–1155)
 Hu Shih (1891–1962)
 Huai Nun Tzu (or Liu An) (179–122 BC)
 Huang Zongxi (or Huang Tsung-hsi) (1610–1695)
 Pierre Daniel Huet (1630–1721)
 Friedrich von Hügel (1852–1925)
 Hugh of St Victor (c. 1078–1141)
 Hui Shi (4th century BC)
 Wilhelm von Humboldt (1767–1835)
 David Hume (1711–1776)
 Jan Hus (1369–1415)
 Edmund Husserl (1859–1938)
 Francis Hutcheson (1694–1746)
 James Hutton (1726–1797)
 Thomas Henry Huxley (1825–1895)
 Christiaan Huygens (1629–1695)
 Hypatia of Alexandria (370–415)
 Jean Hyppolite (1907–1968)

List of philosophers
 (A–C)
 (D–H)
 (I–Q)
 (R–Z)

Notes

References